Jim Kelly Peak, also called Jim Kelly Mountain and Mount Jim Kelly, is the unofficial name conferred by bivouac.com for a mountain in southwestern British Columbia, Canada, located  south of Falls Lake and  west of Tulameen. It lies in the Bedded Range of the northern Canadian Cascades.

These two volcanoes form part of the deeply eroded Pemberton Volcanic Belt, which forms the oldest part of the Canadian Cascade Arc.

References

Volcanoes of British Columbia
Two-thousanders of British Columbia
Miocene lava domes
Cascade Volcanoes
Subduction volcanoes
Extinct volcanoes
Canadian Cascades
Yale Division Yale Land District